Matěj Stříteský (born September 20, 1990 in Vsetín) is a Czech professional ice hockey defenceman. He played with HC Litvínov in the Czech Extraliga during the 2010–11 Czech Extraliga season.

References

External links

1990 births
Czech ice hockey defencemen
HC Litvínov players
Living people
People from Vsetín
Sportspeople from the Zlín Region
HC Karlovy Vary players
HC Plzeň players
HC Most players
VHK Vsetín players
HC Bílí Tygři Liberec players
HC Dukla Jihlava players
BK Mladá Boleslav players
HC Stadion Litoměřice players